The Waxahachie Independent School District is a public school district located in Waxahachie, Texas, a suburban community serving as the county seat for Ellis County, which adjoins Dallas County to the north. Waxahachie ISD is a district of about 8,500 students structured in 17 campuses: 10 elementary school campuses, three junior high campuses, three high school campuses, and one alternative-learning campus. 

In 2012-13 and 2013–14, the school district and all campuses received the highest Texas Education Agency accountability rating of "Met Standard." The district's fine arts programs are frequently state recognized in visual arts, band, choir, dance and theatre arts. WISD has been a consistent award winner and is designated as a NAMM Foundation Best Communities for Music Education designation, one of only 376 districts to receive the prestigious award.

Schools and facilities

High schools
Waxahachie High School (grades 9-12)
Waxahachie Global High School (grades 9-12) - Opened on August 27, 2007, it is an Early College and a Texas-STEM school emphasizing instruction in science, technology, engineering, and mathematics in a small learning-community environment.
Waxahachie High School of Choice (grades 9-12)
Waxahachie Challenge Academy

Junior high schools (grades 6-8)
Coleman Junior High
Finley Junior High
Howard Junior High

Elementary schools (kindergarten - grade 5)
Clift Elementary
Dunaway Elementary
Felty Elementary
Marvin Elementary
Northside Elementary
Shackelford Elementary
Simpson Elementary
Wedgeworth Elementary
Wilemon STEAM Academy

Prekindergarten
Turner Prekindergarten Academy
Marvin Elementary
Northside Elementary

Facilities
 Lumpkins Stadium
 Richards Park

Students

Academics

Students in Waxahachie typically outperform local region and statewide averages on standardized tests.  In 2015-2016 State of Texas Assessments of Academic Readiness (STAAR) results, 80% of students in Waxahachie ISD met Level II Satisfactory standards, compared with 76% in Region 10 and 75% in the state of Texas. The average SAT score of the class of 2015 was 1476, and the average ACT score was 22.6.

Demographics
In the 2015-2016 school year, the school district had a total of 8,107 students, ranging from early childhood education and prekindergarten through grade 12. The class of 2015 included 545 graduates; the annual drop-out rate across grades 9-12 was 2.2%.

As of the 2015-2016 school year, the ethnic distribution of the school district was 49.7% White, 34.8% Hispanic, 11.8% African American, 0.5% Asian, 0.4% American Indian, 0.1% Pacific Islander, and 2.7% from two or more races. Economically disadvantaged students made up 47.1% of the student body.

References

External links
 

School districts in Ellis County, Texas